P.O.D., an initialism for Payable on Death, is an American Christian metal  band formed in 1992 and based in San Diego, California. The band's line-up consists of drummer and rhythm guitarist Wuv Bernardo, vocalist Sonny Sandoval, bassist Traa Daniels, and lead guitarist Marcos Curiel. They have sold over 12 million records worldwide.

Over the course of their career, the band has received three Grammy Award nominations, contributed to numerous motion picture soundtracks and toured internationally. With their third studio album, The Fundamental Elements of Southtown, they achieved their initial mainstream success; the album was certified platinum by the RIAA in 2000. Their following studio album, Satellite, continued the band's success with the singles, "Alive" and "Youth of the Nation", pushing it to go triple platinum.

History

Early years (1991–1993) 

In 1991, friends Wuv Bernardo and Marcos Curiel engaged in jam sessions, with Bernardo playing the drums and Curiel covering guitar with no vocalist. Calling themselves Eschatos, they started playing at keg parties doing Metallica and Slayer cover songs.

After his mother's fatal illness, Sonny Sandoval converted to Christianity and was asked by Bernardo, his cousin, to join the band as a way to keep his mind straight as mentioned on their DVD, Still Payin' Dues. They then recruited bassist Gabe Portillo and eventually changed their name to P.O.D.

Snuff the Punk and Brown (1994–1998) 

After recording a demo tape, Traa Daniels joined the band in 1994 when they needed a bassist for some shows to replace Portillo. P.O.D. signed with Rescue Records, a label created by Bernardo's father, Noah Bernardo Sr., who was also the band's first manager. Between 1994 and 1997, they released three albums under the label, Snuff the Punk, Brown and Payable on Death Live. Longtime manager Tim Cook was first introduced to the band when he booked them to play his club The Where-House in Bartlesville, Oklahoma following strong local word of mouth support. He later described their performance by saying: "I stood at the back of the venue with tears in my eyes – it was the greatest thing I had ever seen." By that point, Bernardo Sr. was looking for someone else to take P.O.D.'s career further and so Cook took over as manager.

Shortly after the release of Payable on Death Live, Essential Records offered P.O.D. a $100,000 recording contract, but on behalf of the band Sandoval told band manager Tim Cook to decline the offer because, "God has a bigger plan for P.O.D." When, in 1998, Atlantic Records A&R John Rubeli first came across P.O.D.'s demo he "didn't quite get it", as he later told HitQuarters. It was only when he saw them play live at The Roxy on the Sunset Strip and witnessed not just an enthusiastic audience singing every word but the center of a vibrant youth movement that he became convinced by the band. The band was quickly signed to a major-label deal. P.O.D. soon released The Warriors EP, a tribute EP to their loyal fans as a transitional album from Rescue Records to Atlantic Records.

The Fundamental Elements of Southtown and Satellite (1999–2002) 

P.O.D.'s third studio album, 1999's The Fundamental Elements of Southtown, spawned the hits "Southtown" and "Rock the Party (Off the Hook)", which was their first video to reach No. 1 on MTV's Total Request Live. The song "School of Hard Knocks" was featured on the soundtrack for Little Nicky while both "Southtown" and "Rock the Party" appeared in the movie. All three music videos endured heavy play on MTV2 and the songs were rock radio hits. The album went on to become RIAA certified platinum.

On September 11, 2001 P.O.D. released their fourth studio album, Satellite. The album's first single, "Alive", went on to become one of MTV's and MTV2's top played videos of the year. The video's popularity, as well as the song's positive message, helped the song become a huge modern rock radio hit and it was Grammy nominated for Best Hard Rock Performance in 2002. Also in 2002, the band contributed the song "America" to Santana's album Shaman.

The album's second single, "Youth of the Nation", was influenced in part by the school shootings at Santana High School, Columbine High School, and Granite Hills High School. It was Grammy nominated for Best Hard Rock Performance in 2003. The 2002 singles, "Boom" and "Satellite", also became quite popular. In addition, the concluding track of the album, "Portrait," was Grammy nominated for Best Metal Performance in 2003. "Boom" was used in, and part of its lyrics the title of, the comedy film Here Comes the Boom, starring Kevin James.

Satellite went on to become RIAA-certified triple platinum. The author of Encyclopedia of Contemporary Christian Music has described P.O.D. as "One of the biggest success stories in recent Christian music."

Payable on Death and Testify (2003–2006) 

On February 19, 2003, guitarist Curiel left the band due to his side project, The Accident Experiment, and "spiritual differences." However, Curiel claimed that he was actually kicked out of the band. Curiel was replaced by Jason Truby, former member of Christian metal band Living Sacrifice, and assisted with the recording of  "Sleeping Awake", from The Matrix Reloaded soundtrack. In an interview with Yahoo! Music, Sandoval stated that Truby is the reason why the group is still together. On November 4, 2003, P.O.D. released their fifth studio album, Payable on Death, which saw the group shift from their well-known rapcore sound to a darker, more melodic metal sound. The album was hit with controversy due to its "occult" cover, which led as many as 85% of Christian bookstores across the United States to ban the album. With the help of the album's hit single "Will You" and "Change the World", it went on to sell over 520,000 copies and was certified Gold. Sometime after the tsunami in Asia, many singers, musicians, and actors/actresses, including Sandoval and Bernardo, participated in the recording of "Forever in Our Hearts", with all proceeds going to benefit the tsunami relief.

P.O.D.'s sixth studio album Testify was slated for a December 2005 release, but was pushed back to January 24, 2006. On November 15, 2005, P.O.D. released The Warriors EP, Volume 2, which featured demos from the upcoming album, to help build up the fans' anticipation for the pending January release. The album's first single, "Goodbye for Now" (with a vocal tag by a then-unknown Katy Perry) went on to become a No. 1 video on MTV's TRL, along with having a solid radio presence, it also became the band's unprecedented 4th number one video on Total Request Live. The second single off the album, "Lights Out" was a minor hit, but was featured as the official theme song to WWE's Survivor Series 2005. In another contribution to WWE, they performed fellow San Diego native Rey Mysterio's theme song "Booyaka 619" at WrestleMania 22. To promote their latest album, P.O.D. went on a nationwide tour called the "Warriors Tour 2: Guilty by Association", which began in April, and included the bands Pillar, The Chariot and Maylene and the Sons of Disaster.

On August 11, 2006, P.O.D. announced in their online newsletter that they had left Atlantic Records.
On September 16, 2006, P.O.D. announced that they had teamed up with Rhino Records to release a greatest hits record simply titled, Greatest Hits: The Atlantic Years, which was released on November 21, 2006. They shot a music video for their single "Going In Blind", one of the two new songs they included in the tenth album, and they had meetings with various record labels to begin working on new material for an album they hoped to release in mid-2007.

When Angels & Serpents Dance (2007–2009) 

In a statement made by the band's manager on their MySpace page, it was officially announced, on December 30, 2006, that Jason Truby had left the band. They had said "God worked it out because Truby decided to leave the band the same day Curiel asked to rejoin." Curiel performed with the band for the first time since his departure on the 2006 New Year's Eve episode of Jimmy Kimmel Live!.

On February 2, 2007, the band made a new record deal with INO Records.

On June 1, 2007, at the Rockbox in San Diego, the band performed and revealed a new song entitled "Condescending", along with another new song performed on June 16, 2007, at the Journeys Backyard BBQ tour entitled "Addicted". They also revealed the title of their new album to be When Angels & Serpents Dance. On August 4, 2007, the band played at Angel Stadium of Anaheim's annual Harvest Crusade for a crowd of 42,000, where they revealed a new song, "I'll Be Ready", originally thought to be titled "When Babylon Come for I".

The album cover was officially revealed on December 10, 2007.  The title track was released for free download on their site in January 2008. The first single "Addicted" was released on February 19 and peaked at No. 30 on the Mainstream Rock chart. The album was released on April 8, 2008, entitled When Angels & Serpents Dance. On July 28, 2008, the group played a free public performance at the Orange County Choppers headquarters in Newburgh, NY, with OCC The Band opening. The band also played on August 16, 2008, at the Angel Stadium of Anaheim's annual Harvest Crusade. During September 2008 P.O.D played alongside Redline, Behind Crimson Eyes, Alter Bridge, and Disturbed as part of the Music As a Weapon tour 2008 in Australia.

Murdered Love (2010–2013) 

The band headlined the first annual Spring Jam Fest in May 2011. They appeared on the Rock of Allegiance tour later that summer. On July 25, 2011, the band released a demo of the song "On Fire" as a free download on their official website.

In October 2011, P.O.D. announced a multi-album artist deal with Razor & Tie. On April 5, 2012, the song  "Eyez" became a free download on the band's website for a limited time. Shortly after, an article on their website stated that "Lost in Forever" would be the first single from the new album, entitled Murdered Love.

Murdered Love was originally going to be released in June 2012, but was instead pushed back to July 10. The album was produced by Howard Benson, who also produced Satellite and The Fundamental Elements of Southtown. It was described by Curiel as "Back to our roots. A little bit of hip hop, a little bit of punk rock, or reggae". The album caused controversy concerning its eleventh track, "I Am", which uses the word "fuck" (albeit backmasked). Sandoval, explaining the purpose of the song, said:
 
The band went on tour with Shinedown and Three Days Grace as an opening act.

In a 2012 interview with Broken Records Magazine, Sandoval said that the band had to get their lives back in order and take care of personal needs before getting back into music, but was extremely happy about the response the band was getting from fans.

On October 22, 2013, P.O.D. released a deluxe edition of Murdered Love. The album contains the original songs, slightly remixed, along with bonus tracks "Find a Way", "Burn It Down", acoustic versions of "Beautiful" and "West Coast Rock Steady", a remixed version of "On Fire", and music videos for "Murdered Love", "Beautiful", "Higher", and "Lost In Forever". Multiple behind the scenes videos were also on the track list.

SoCal Sessions, The Awakening and Circles (2014–present) 
In mid-2014, P.O.D. announced an acoustic album to be released toward the end of the year. The album was crowd-funded on the website PledgeMusic. On October 20, 2014, P.O.D. announced a new record deal with T-Boy Records along with a new acoustic album. SoCal Sessions was released on November 17, 2014, and contained songs such as "Alive" and "Youth of the Nation".

The band followed that release with another studio album, The Awakening, released on August 21, 2015, which was produced by Howard Benson, with guest vocalists such as Maria Brink of In This Moment and Lou Koller of Sick of It All.

On May 17, 2016, the band announced that they would be taking part in the Make America Rock Again super tour throughout the summer and fall 2016. The tour featured a number of artists who had success throughout the 2000s.

On August 18, 2017, the band released a new song, "Soundboy Killa", and embarked on a fall tour promoting the song.

In January 2018, it was announced that the band had signed a new record deal with Mascot Records. They toured alongside Alien Ant Farm, Lit, and Buckcherry on the "Gen-X Tour" in 2018. Their tenth studio album, Circles, was released on November 16, 2018.

The band embarked on their Satellite Album 20th Anniversary tour with From Ashes to New and All Good Things in 2021, starting in Sturgis, South Dakota at Buffalo Chip on August 14, 2021, and ending on October 7, 2021, at the House of Blues in San Diego, California.
In August 2022 they performed two sets on the same day at Seaworld. On October 14th, 2022, the band reissued When Angels & Serpents Dance, having the album remixed and remastered as well as featuring three bonus songs, one of which, "Don't Fake It", had appeared previously as an iTunes exclusive in 2008.

Musical style and influences 

The band's name, Payable on Death (P.O.D.), derives itself from the banking term "Payable on Death". The band chose this name to be a direct tie in with the Christian theology that explains that since Jesus died on the Cross, Christians' debts to God have been paid for; in other words all believers, in their acceptance that Jesus was sacrificed for them on God's behalf, have inherited eternal life. P.O.D.'s style has evolved over the years, from the rap metal sound on their early albums to the nu metal and reggae-infused alternative metal styles for which they're most well known. The band's seventh album, When Angels & Serpents Dance, is a combination of alternative rock, reggae rock and Latin-influenced metal with almost none of the rap metal or nu metal sound of their older releases. P.O.D.'s influences include Boogie Down Productions, Run-DMC, U2, the Police, Bad Brains, Santana, Metallica, AC/DC, Suicidal Tendencies, Bob Marley, Primus, Earth, Wind & Fire, 24-7 Spyz, and Steel Pulse.

Band members 
Current members

 Sonny Sandoval − lead vocals (1992–present)
 Traa Daniels − bass, backing vocals (1993–present)
 Marcos Curiel − lead guitar, programming, backing vocals (1992–2003, 2006–present)
 Wuv Bernardo − drums, rhythm guitar, backing vocals (1992–present)

Current touring musicians
 Ryan Flores – bass (2022–present) 
 Alex Lopez − drums (2022–present)

Former members
 Gabe Portillo − bass, backing vocals (1992–1993)
 Jason Truby − lead guitar, backing vocals (2003–2006)

Former touring musicians

 Tim Pacheco – backing vocals, percussion, trumpet, keyboards (2006, 2021)
 Luis Castillo – keyboards, backing vocals, percussion (2011–2016, 2021)
 Sameer Bhattacharya – keyboards, backing vocals (2016–2018)
 Jon Young (Jonny Beats) – drums (2018–2022)

Timeline

Discography 

 Snuff the Punk (1994)
 Brown (1996)
 The Fundamental Elements of Southtown (1999)
 Satellite (2001)
 Payable on Death (2003)
 Testify (2006)
 When Angels & Serpents Dance (2008)
 Murdered Love (2012)
 The Awakening (2015)
 Circles (2018)

Awards 

American Music Awards

 2003 - Favorite Contemporary Inspirational Artist (nomination)

Echo Awards

 2003 - International Alternative Group of the Year

San Diego Music Awards

 1999 - Best Hard Rock Artist
 2000 - Best Hard Rock Artist

Note: Album- and single-specific awards and nominations are listed under their respective articles.

References

External links 

 

American alternative metal musical groups
American Christian metal musical groups
Alternative rock groups from California
Atlantic Records artists
Christian alternative metal groups
Christian rock groups from California
Hard rock musical groups from California
Musical groups established in 1992
Musical groups from San Diego
Musical quartets
Nu metal musical groups from California
Rapcore groups
P.O.D.
Razor & Tie artists
Christianity in popular culture